Sclerorhynchus (from  , 'hard' and   'snout') is an extinct genus of ganopristid sclerorhynchoid that lived during the Late Cretaceous. The genus Ganopristis is considered a junior synonym of Sclerorhynchus. It was a widespread genus, with fossils found in the Middle East (S. atavus, S. karakensis), North Africa (S. leptodon), Europe (S. leptodon), and North America (S. fanninensis, S. pettersi, S. priscus). While it had a long rostrum with large denticles similar to sawfishes and sawsharks, its closest living relatives are actually skates. Complete specimens of S. atavus show that its fin arrangement was similar to skates, with the pectoral and pelvic fins touching, both dorsal fins located behind the pelvic fins, and a reduced caudal fin.

References

Prehistoric cartilaginous fish genera
Cretaceous cartilaginous fish
Prehistoric fish of Africa
Late Cretaceous fish of North America
Taxa named by Arthur Smith Woodward